Abel Rolando Moralejo  (born 2 November 1955 in Lincoln) is a former Argentine football player and current manager.

Moralejo has worked as a manager in Guatemala with Deportivo Heredia, In El Salvador with Once Municipal, in Bolivia win  Club Blooming, in Paraguay with Sportivo Luqueño, Ecuadorian teams LDU Portoviejo and Macará and with several clubs in Argentina.

References

External links

 

1955 births
Living people
Argentine footballers
Argentine football managers
Club Blooming managers
Expatriate football managers in El Salvador
Association footballers not categorized by position
People from Lincoln Partido
Sportspeople from Buenos Aires Province
Sportivo Luqueño managers
S.D. Quito managers